Fritz Medicus (April 23, 1876 – January 13, 1956) was a German-Swiss philosopher. He was awarded his doctorate while studying in Jena, with the publication of his dissertation, Kant's transcendental aesthetics and non-euclidian geometry. He was the Chair of Philosophy at the Martin Luther University of Halle-Wittenberg, and moved to ETH Zurich in 1911. Medicus wrote in the tradition of German idealism.

See also
 List of German-language philosophers

Further reading

References

External links
 

German philosophers
Swiss philosophers
Academic staff of ETH Zurich
1876 births
1956 deaths